The Brandon Village Hall and Library is located in Brandon, Wisconsin. It was added to the National Register of Historic Places in 2008.

History
The building was originally constructed as retail building and cold storage plant. In 1897, it was purchased by the Village of Brandon. The village would transform the cold storage plant portions of the building to house meeting rooms and the fire department. Another portion of the building was still used for retail purposes until 1913, at which time the public library moved into the space. When the fire department moved to other quarters, that area became a garage. In 1973, the library expanded into the garage space. The meeting room areas later became the village hall. In 2001, the village hall portion became a museum for the Brandon Historical Society.

References

External links
 Brandon Library

Government buildings completed in 1894
Library buildings completed in 1894
City and town halls on the National Register of Historic Places in Wisconsin
Public libraries in Wisconsin
Museums in Fond du Lac County, Wisconsin
Libraries on the National Register of Historic Places in Wisconsin
National Register of Historic Places in Fond du Lac County, Wisconsin
City and town halls in Wisconsin